Digenis Akritas Ipsona was a Cypriot football club based in Ipsonas, Limassol. Founded in 1956, was playing sometimes in Second, in Third and in Fourth Division. In 2014 merged with Enosi Neon Ypsona to form Enosi Neon Ypsona-Digenis Ipsona.

Honours
 Cypriot Third Division:
 Champions (2): 1982, 1989

References

Association football clubs disestablished in 2014
Defunct football clubs in Cyprus
Association football clubs established in 1958
1958 establishments in Cyprus
2014 disestablishments in Cyprus